Collagically Speaking is the debut studio album by jazz supergroup R+R=NOW. It was released on June 15, 2018 through Blue Note Records. Recording sessions took place at Henson Recording Studios in Los Angeles. Production was handled by Christian Scott aTunde Adjuah, Derrick Hodge, Justin Tyson, Robert Glasper, Taylor McFerrin and Terrace Martin, with Nicole Hegeman and Vincent Bennett serving as executive producers. It features contributions from Amanda Seales, Amber Navran, Goapele Mohlabane, India Shawn, Jahi Sundance, Mirna Jose, Omari Hardwick, Stalley, Terry Crews and Yasiin Bey.

Critical reception 

Collagically Speaking was met with generally favorable reviews from music critics. At Metacritic, which assigns a normalized rating out of 100 to reviews from mainstream publications, the album received an average score of 77 based on five reviews.

AllMusic's Matt Collar wrote: "none of these more pointedly thought-provoking [spoken word] additions detract from the overall flow of the album, and instead add to the overarching vibe of open-minded creativity, love, and empowerment". Marcus J. Moore of Pitchfork wrote: "while the album's open-endedness largely works to its benefit, Collagically Speaking occasionally meanders". In a mixed review, Hank Shteamer of Rolling Stone wrote: "singing, rapping and spoken-word float through these tracks, as do soulful improvs from Adjuah, Glasper and others, but what lingers is the overall aura: a no-seams-showing blend of jazz, R&B and hip-hop, with a spontaneous "3 a.m. in the studio" feel".

Track listing

Personnel 

 Derrick Hodge – bass, songwriter, producer
 Justin Tyson – drums and songwriter (tracks 1–8, 10), producer
 Robert Glasper – keyboards (tracks 1–8), piano (track 11), songwriter (tracks 1–8, 11), vocals (track 3), producer
 Taylor McFerrin – synthesizer (tracks 1–5, 7–11), songwriter (tracks 1–3, 5, 7–11), producer
 Terrace Martin – synthesizer and songwriter (tracks 1–6, 8), vocoder (tracks 1, 2, 5, 6, 8), saxophone (track 4), additional tracking, producer
 Christian Scott – trumpet and songwriter (tracks 1–5, 7, 10, 11), producer
 Rose McKinney – songwriter (tracks 1–6, 8)
 Goapele Mohlabane – vocals (track 1)
 India Shawn – vocals (track 3)
 Jahi Sundance – vocals (track 3), turntables & songwriter (tracks 3, 11)
 Mirna Jose – vocals (track 3)
 Omari Hardwick – vocals and songwriter (track 5)
 Michael "Phoelix" Neil – songwriter (track 5)
 Arin Ray – songwriter (track 6)
 Terry Crews – vocals and songwriter (track 7)
 Kyle "Stalley" Myricks – vocals and songwriter (track 8)
 Amanda Seales – vocals and songwriter (track 9)
 Amber Navran – vocals and songwriter (track 11)
 Dante "Mos Def/Yasiin Bey" Smith – vocals and songwriter (track 11)
 Keith "Qmillion" Lewis – recording, mixing
 Bryan DiMaio – engineering
 Robert "G Koop" Mandell – engineering
 Collin Kadlec – recording assistant
 Derrick Stockwell – recording assistant
 Chris Athens – mastering
 Nicole Hegeman – executive producer
 Vincent Bennett – executive producer
 Stephanie Darden – design
 Delphine Diaw Diallo – photography
 Chris Baldwin – photography
 Elizabeth Craig – photography
 Mathieu Bitton – photography
 Simon Benjamin – photography
 Justin "J3" Jackson – photography
 Freda Knowles – artist coordinator

Charts

References

External links 
 

2018 albums
Blue Note Records albums
Albums produced by Terrace Martin